The year 1703 in music involved some significant events.

Events
January – Johann Sebastian Bach is appointed court musician in the chapel of Duke Johann Ernst III in Weimar, his first such professional appointment, although probably including menial duties.
by July – George Frideric Handel takes a position as violinist and harpsichordist in the orchestra of the Hamburg Oper am Gänsemarkt.
14 August – J. S. Bach accepts the post of organist at the New Church, Arnstadt.
September – Antonio Vivaldi, newly ordained as a priest, is appointed maestro di violino (master of violin) at the Ospedale della Pietà orphanage in Venice, for which he begins teaching and composing.
ca. December – Alessandro Scarlatti becomes maestro di cappella at Santa Maria Maggiore in Rome.
Nicolas Bernier publishes his first cantatas, the earliest in the French language.

Classical music 
Henricus Albicastro – 6 Violin Sonatas, Op.5
Johann Sebastian Bach  
Concerto and Fugue in C minor, BWV 909
Denket doch, ihr Menschenkinder, BWV 1122
Wo Gott zum Haus nicht gibt sein Gunst, BWV 1123
Ich ruf zu dir, Herr Jesu Christ, BWV 1124
O Gott, du frommer Gott, BWV 1125
Giovanni Bononcini – Proteo sul Reno
Sébastien de Brossard  
Abraham ou le sacrifice d'Isaac
Judith ou la mort d'Holopherne
 Antonio Caldara – La castità al cimento
André Campra – Motets, Livre 3
Gaspard Corrette – Messe du 8e Ton pour l’Orgue
François Couperin – Quatre versets d'un motet (sacred music)
George Frideric Handel – Keyboard Sonata in C major, HWV 577
Christian Liebe – Machet die Tore weit
Louis Marchand – Pièces de clavecin, Livre 2
James Paisible - Six sonatas of two parts for two flutes, Op. 1
Andrew Parcham – Recorder Sonata in G major
Alessandro Scarlatti – S. Casimiro, re di Polonia
Andreas Heinrich Schultze – 6 Recorder Sonatas

Opera
Antonio Caldara
Farnace
Gli equivoci del sembiante
Francesco Gasparini – Amor della patria
Antonio Quintavalle – Il trionfo d'amore
Domenico Scarlatti – Il Giustino

Musical theater
William Corbett – As You Find It

Births 
 20 January – Joseph-Hector Fiocco, composer and violinist (died 1741)
 29 January – Carlmann Kolb, priest, organist and composer (died 1765)
date unknown
Jean-Marie Leclair the younger, composer (died 1777)
John Frederick Lampe, musician (died 1751)
John Travers, organist and composer (died 1758)
Johann Gottlieb Graun, German Baroque/Classical era composer and violinist (died 1771)

Deaths 
March 31 – Johann Christoph Bach, organist and composer (born 1642)
September 14 – Gilles Jullien, composer and organist (born 1639)
October 3 – Alessandro Melani, composer (b. 1639
November 30 – Nicolas de Grigny, organist and composer (born 1672)
probable – Jacek Różycki, composer (born c.1635)

References

 
18th century in music
Music by year